Dunhams Wood is a privately owned broadleaved woodland that is occasionally open to the public. The area was planted over a period of 6 years starting in 1985. It is located approximately  outside March, Cambridgeshire in Fenland.

The area was initially owned by Margaret and Arthur Dunham, who opened the woodlands to the public during the summer. Treasure hunts and other games took place within the wood. A major feature of the wood is the Dunhams Wood Railway.

The woodland has also been used as a venue for various events including wildlife viewing, photography and archery. Margaret and Arthur Dunham were interviewed for the BBC Radio 4 programme Breakfast with a Farmer in 1992.

Following the death of Arthur Dunham on 13 January 2013, the woodland was closed to the public and offered for sale. It was sold in August 2014. Although the railway remains in the wood,

References 

BBC Radio 4: Breakfast with a Farmer, July 1992.
Fenland Advertiser  "Magical family day at Wood" 8 August 2008
 Fenland Citizen "If you go down to the Wood just now..." By Sue Irving 25 July 2007 
Cambridgeshire Times  "Woodland for sale: Buy a little slice of heaven."

Tourist attractions in Cambridgeshire
Forests and woodlands of Cambridgeshire